The 2022 AFC Women's Club Championship (also known as the AFC Women's Club Championship 2022 – Pilot Tournament), held between 15 August and 22 October, was the third edition of AFC's premier women's club football competition. Five clubs from five AFC member associations competed in this tournament. A final had been originally scheduled for 22 October, but was never played. Thailand's College of Asian Scholars won the East zone title and Uzbekistan's Sogdiyona Jizzak won the West zone title.

Format
The participating clubs were split into two regions to play a single round-robin tournament within their region at a predetermined host site. The two regional winners were to meet in a final on 22 October.

Originally planned as a seven-club tournament, Jordan's Orthodox FC withdrew on 5 August 2022.

On 15 August 2022, FIFA suspended the All India Football Federation due to undue influence from third parties, meaning Gokulam Kerala were disqualified: the two remaining clubs in the west region playing a two-legged tie at the predetermined host site.

Group stage

East region

West region 

Sogdiyona Jizzak won 2–1 on aggregate.

Goalscorers

See also
 Continental Club Championship
 2022 CAF Women's Champions League (Africa)
 2022 Copa Libertadores Femenina (South America)
 2021–22 UEFA Women's Champions League (Europe)

 Regional Club Championship
 2022 UNCAF Women's Interclub Championship (Central America)
 2022 WAFF Women's Clubs Championship (Western Asia)

Notes

References

External links
 , the-afc.com

2022
2022 in women's association football
 Women's Club Championship